Abbé François Blanchet (26 January 1707 – 29 January 1784) was a French littérateur, or Intellectual. He spent his younger years in a Jesuit (Society of Jesus) order. Blanchet was the author of Apologues and Tales, a highly esteemed work.

Works
 Apologues et Contes Orientaux (1784, Paris) (in English, Apologues and Tales)

References
 

1707 births
1784 deaths
French male writers